Culter recurviceps is a species of ray-finned fish in the genus Culter from the Pearl River and Hainan in southern China.

References

Culter (fish)
Fish described in 1846